Haritha G Nair is an Indian television actress who appears in Malayalam-language serials.

Early and personal life

Haritha is a nurse-turned-actress who hails from Kottayam district of Kerala. She has an elder brother, Hareesh.

She got engaged to film editor V. S. Vinayak on 20 June 2022.

Career
Haritha was a finalist in the talent-hunt show Tharodayam in 2018. She made her acting debut with a supporting role, Sreekutty, in soap-opera Kasthooriman.

In 2019, she played a possessed girl, Shivaganga in horror drama, Unnimaya. From 2020 to 2022, she played the lead role of Keerthi in  Thinkalkalamaan.

Filmography

Films

Television

Special appearances

Awards

References

Living people
21st-century Indian actresses
Actresses in Malayalam television
Indian television actresses
Actresses in Malayalam cinema
Year of birth missing (living people)